Isaac Opoku Donkor (born 15 August 1995) is a Ghanaian professional footballer who plays as a defender for Turkish club Sakaryaspor. He plays mainly at centre-back but can also operate as a right-back.

Club career
He made his debut in the Europa League on 22 November 2012 against FC Rubin Kazan.

On 2 September 2019, he signed a contract with Austrian club Sturm Graz for one year with an extension option.

Career statistics

Club

References

1995 births
Living people
Footballers from Kumasi
Association football central defenders
Ghanaian footballers
Inter Milan players
S.S.C. Bari players
U.S. Avellino 1912 players
A.C. Cesena players
CS Universitatea Craiova players
SK Sturm Graz players
Adanaspor footballers
Sakaryaspor footballers
Serie A players
Serie B players
Liga I players
Austrian Football Bundesliga players
TFF First League players
Ghanaian expatriate footballers
Expatriate footballers in Italy
Ghanaian expatriate sportspeople in Italy
Expatriate footballers in Romania
Ghanaian expatriate sportspeople in Romania
Expatriate footballers in Austria
Ghanaian expatriate sportspeople in Austria
Expatriate footballers in Turkey
Ghanaian expatriate sportspeople in Turkey